Rivira is a weekly Sinhala newspaper in Sri Lanka. It is published on every Sunday, by Rivira Media Corporation (Pvt) Ltd. It is a sister newspaper of The Nation, which entered into the business in 2006. It has a circulation of 265,000 per issue and an estimated readership of 1,600,000 by 2012. The newspaper comes with 5 supplements.

References

External links
  official Website
 

Publications established in 2006
Rivira Media Corporation
Sinhala-language newspapers published in Sri Lanka
Sunday newspapers published in Sri Lanka
2006 establishments in Sri Lanka